Multiscale geometric analysis or geometric multiscale analysis is an emerging area of high-dimensional signal processing and data analysis.

See also
Wavelet
Scale space
Multi-scale approaches
Multiresolution analysis
Singular value decomposition
Compressed sensing

Further reading
 
 
 

Signal processing
Spatial analysis